USS LST-380 was a  of the United States Navy during World War II, later loaned to the Royal Navy.

LST-380 was laid down on 10 December 1942 at Quincy, Massachusetts, by the Bethlehem Steel Company; launched on 10 February 1943; sponsored by Mrs. D. J. Callahan; and commissioned on 15 February 1943.

During World War II, LST-380 was assigned to the European theater and participated in the following operations:
 Sicilian occupation — July 1943
 Salerno landings — September 1943
 Invasion of Normandy — June 1944

LST-380 was transferred to the United Kingdom on 20 November 1944 and returned to United States Navy custody on 11 April 1946. On 7 June 1946, the tank landing ship was sold to the United States Military Government, Korea, and struck from the Navy list on 19 July 1946.

LST-380 earned three battle stars for World War II service.

M/V Salvage Chief 
In 1948, Fred Devine of Portland, Oregon purchased the ex-LST-380 to convert it for shallow-water salvage work. The bow doors were welded shut, extra anchor winches and anchors were added, and a helipad built on the aft deck. Renamed Salvage Chief and based in Astoria, Oregon, the ship assisted in rescue and recovery operations along the Pacific Coast from 1949 to 2015. Notable salvage operations included the SS Yorkmar in 1952, the SS Sansinena in 1976, and the Exxon Valdez in 1989. In 2016, the ship was sold to Salvage Chief LLC and remains in Astoria for training.

References

External links
 , Famed West Coast Salvage Vessel May Sail Again

 

LST-1-class tank landing ships of the United States Navy
Ships built in Quincy, Massachusetts
1943 ships
World War II amphibious warfare vessels of the United States
LST-1-class tank landing ships of the Royal Navy
World War II amphibious warfare vessels of the United Kingdom